Kota Gandredu is a village panchayat in Gurla mandal of Vizianagaram district in Andhra Pradesh, India.

Demographics
According to Indian census, 2001, the demographics of this village is as follows:
 Total Population - 2,325
 Male Population - 1.145
 Female Population - 1,180
 Children under 6 years age - 283 (Boys - 133 and Girls - 150)
 Total Literates - 979

References

Villages in Vizianagaram district